R Subramaniakumar is an Indian businessman. He is the managing director and chief executive officer of Ratnakar Bank Limited. He was the former executive director at Indian Bank and Indian Overseas Bank.

Early life and education
Subramaniakumar is a Physics graduate with PGDCA.

Career
Subramaniakumar started his career with Punjab National Bank and lead the Business Transformation. He was the executive director at Indian Bank. He was the executive director and also the MD and CEO of Indian Overseas Bank. He was an administrator at Dewan Housing Financial Corporation. He also was an Independent Director of the UC Pension Fund Limited. On 24 June 22, he joined Ratnakar Bank Limited as the managing director and chief executive officer.

References

Living people
Indian bankers
Indian chief executives
Indian businesspeople
Year of birth missing (living people)